Mediator complex subunit 10 (Med10) is a protein that in humans is encoded by the MED10 gene.

Function 

Med10 is a component of the Mediator complex, which is a coactivator for DNA-binding factors that activate transcription via RNA polymerase II.[supplied by OMIM, Oct 2008].

See also 
Mediator

References